A penumbral lunar eclipse will take place on April 5, 2042.

Visibility

Related lunar eclipses

Lunar year series

See also 
List of lunar eclipses and List of 21st-century lunar eclipses

Notes

External links 
 

2042-04
2042-04
2042 in science